Nabajyoti College or NJC is an educational institution in Kalgachia, in the  Barpeta District of Assam, India. The college is affiliated with the University of Gauhati. It is the oldest college in the district in Muslim minority-dominated area. It has been imparting education to many students from an area predominantly inhabited by socially and economically backward segments of the population on Char Chapori of Assam.

History 

NJC was established on 3 September 1971 by Abdul Kader Babu, a local educationist and socio-political figure along with fellow followers of Fakaruddin Ali Ahmed as a night college, with the goal of providing educational opportunities to the poor students of the region as well as the minority community. The foundation stone of this college was laid by the late honourable president of India, Marhum Fakaruddin Ali Ahmed. Late Basir Uddin Ahmed was the first Principal and Founder, vice principal Md Muzzamel Hussain of this college.

The institution was brought under the deficit system of grants-in-aid in December 1979, by the Government of Assam. It has been affiliated to the U.G.C. Under 2(f) since 1979.

Departments
The college currently has a science and arts stream along with an Industrial Fish & Fisheries department for imparting skills for self-employment in fisheries. The college has the following departments:
 Accountancy
 Assamese
 Economics
 Education
 English
 Finance
 History
 Political Science
 Philosophy
 Physics
 Chemistry
 Economics
 Mathematics
 Zoology
 Botany

Two and three year degrees are awarded in arts and in finance, as well as vocational diplomas in tourism, travel management, and computer application.

Accreditation 
In 2004 the college has been awarded a "B" grade by the National Assessment and Accreditation Council.

References 

Colleges affiliated to Gauhati University
Universities and colleges in Assam
1971 establishments in Assam
Educational institutions established in 1971